or simply Gulliver Boy is a Japanese anime series created by Oji Hiroi and Toyoo Ashida. It was produced by Toei Animation, directed by Ashida and aired on Fuji TV from January 8, 1995 to December 24 of that year. On December 5, 2012, Pony Canyon released the series in a DVD box in Japan.

Characters 
Gulliver Toscanni
Protagonist of the series, a magician who must remain enclosed in the Yoke magic school to protect his friend Edison. When he returns to his country, Venice, he finds out that it is being attacked by Spain.

Edison
Young scientific genius, Gulliver's friend.

Misty
A girl, the friend of Gulliver, who saved him from the troops of Spain.

Phoebe
A Dark fairy who takes a liking to Gulliver, and vows never to leave his side.

King Yudo
King of Spain, deeply in love with Misty. He killed Gulliver's father, but when he was informed that there was a son, promised himself that he would kill the son, so they could be in paradise together. It is later revealed in the second half of the series that he is controlled by Hallelujah, the sums of evil.

King of Venice
His kingdom is attacked by the army of Spain.  He does not understand why Yudo is doing this, since there was previously peace between the two countries.

Papa Toscanni
Raises Gulliver as his son. Yudo kills him, but before he dies he manages to confess to Gulliver that he is not his true father.

Hallelujah
The true main antagonist of the first part of the series (before being replaced by Daisaemon for the second part of the series). Hallelujah is a demon and the origin of all evil in the world; a world that she intends to devour. She brainwashes the faux main antagonist Yudo who uses Spain in an attempt to take over Europe.

Voices and dubbing

Music

Ignite! Gulliver Boy 

 is a song by Jpop vocalist Kiyohiko Ozaki and serves as the opening theme to the anime Gulliver Boy. It was released Mercury Music Entertainment on February 25, 1995 in Japan only. The song was written by Yukinojo Mori, composed by Toshiaki Yamazaki, and arranged by Michihiko Ohta. Coupled with the song is the show's first closing theme "Kagami no Naka no Yūsha" which is also performed by Ozaki.
 
Track List
燃えろ!ガリバーボーイMoero! Garibābōi/Ignite! Gulliver Boy
鏡の中の勇者Kagami no Naka no Yūsha/A Brave Man in the Mirror
燃えろ!ガリバーボーイ(オリジナル・カラオケ)Moero! Garibābōi (Orijinaru Karaoke)/Ignite! Gulliver Boy (Original Karaoke)
鏡の中の勇者(オリジナル・カラオケ)Kagami no Naka no Yūsha (Orijinaru Karaoke)/A Brave Man in the Mirror (Original Karaoke)

Aitai Kara 

 is a song by Jpop vocalist Misumi and serves as the second closing theme to the anime Gulliver Boy. It was released by Mercury Music Entertainment on September 25, 1995 in Japan only. The song was written by Takahiro Maeda with composition and arrangements by Masahiro Takatsuki. The song is coupled with another Misumi song called "Dreamer".

Track List
逢いたいからAitai Kara/Because I Want to Meet
Dreamer
逢いたいから(オリジナル・カラオケ)Aitai Kara (Orijinaru Karaoke)/Because I Want to Meet (Original Karaoke)

Video games 
Name: 
Publishers: Hudson Soft (Sega Saturn, PC Engine); Bandai (Game Boy, SNES).
Releases date:
  Game Boy
  PC Engine
  Sega Saturn
  SNES

All in Japan

Genre: Role-playing video game, Puzzle (Game Boy)
Players: One Player
Platforms: Game Boy, SNES, PC Engine, Sega Saturn
Language: Japanese

References

External links
Studio Live page

rpgfan.com 

1995 anime television series debuts
1995 Japanese television series endings
Action anime and manga
Adventure anime and manga
Fuji TV original programming
Oji Hiroi
Toei Animation television